Sinapinic acid, or sinapic acid (Sinapine - Origin: L. Sinapi, sinapis, mustard, Gr., cf. F. Sinapine.), is a small naturally occurring hydroxycinnamic acid. It is a member of the phenylpropanoid family.  It is a commonly used matrix in MALDI mass spectrometry.  It is a useful matrix for a wide variety of peptides and proteins.  It serves well as a matrix for MALDI due to its ability to absorb laser radiation and to also donate protons (H+) to the analyte of interest.

Sinapic acid can form dimers with itself (one structure) and ferulic acid (three different structures) in cereal cell walls and therefore may have a similar influence on cell-wall structure to that of the diferulic acids.

Sinapine is an alkaloidal amine found in black mustard seeds. It is considered a choline ester of sinapinic acid.

Natural occurrences 
Sinapinic acid can be found in wine and vinegar.

Metabolism 
Sinapate 1-glucosyltransferase is an enzyme that uses UDP-glucose and sinapate to produce UDP and 1-sinapoyl-D-glucose.

Sinapoylglucose—malate O-sinapoyltransferase is an enzyme that uses 1-O-sinapoyl-beta-D-glucose and (S)-malate to produce D-glucose and sinapoyl-(S)-malate.

Related compounds 
Canolol is a phenolic compound found in crude canola oil. It is produced by decarboxylation of sinapic acid during canola seed roasting.

See also 

Phenolic content in wine
Syringaldehyde
Syringol
Syringic acid
Acetosyringone
Sinapyl alcohol
Sinapaldehyde
Sinapine
Canolol

References 

O-methylated hydroxycinnamic acids
Vinylogous carboxylic acids